KXM is an American hard rock supergroup formed in 2013, consisting of Korn drummer Ray Luzier, King's X bassist/vocalist dUg Pinnick and Lynch Mob/ex-Dokken guitarist George Lynch. Signed to Rat Pak Records, they have released a self-titled album in 2014, Scatterbrain in 2017 and Circle of Dolls in 2019, the latter through Frontiers Records.

Background 

KXM was formed when the three members met during a birthday party for Luzier's son. The drummer took the other two through a tour of his new home studio and suggested the three put together an album. According to Lynch, the name KXM was derived from each member's full-time band: K from Korn, X from King's X, and M from Lynch Mob.

The band released their self-titled debut album on March 11, 2014, through Rat Pak Records.  

A second album, Scatterbrain, was released on March 17, 2017.

In January 2018, it was reported that KXM was in the studio recording their third album, Circle of Dolls, which was released on September 13, 2019, via Frontiers Records.

Discography
KXM (Rat Pak Records, 2014)
Scatterbrain (Rat Pak, 2017)
Circle of Dolls (Rat Pak; Frontiers, 2019)

References

2013 establishments in California
Hard rock musical groups from California
Musical groups established in 2013
American musical trios
Rock music supergroups
Frontiers Records artists